Zatz is a surname. Notable people with the surname include:
 Luisa Mell (born 1978, actual name Marina Zatz de Camargo), Brazilian presenter and animal activist
 Marjorie Zatz (born 1955), American sociologist 
 Mayana Zatz (born 1947), Israeli-born Brazilian molecular biologist and geneticist